Baby Kamble (1929-21 April 2012), commonly known as Babytai Kamble, was an Indian activist and writer. She was born into an untouchable caste, Mahar, the largest untouchable community in Maharashtra. She was a well-known Dalit activist and writer who was inspired by B. R. Ambedkar, prominent dalit leader. Kamble and her family converted to Buddhism and remained lifelong practicing Buddhists. In her community, she came to be admired as a writer and was fondly called as Tai (meaning sister). She is widely remembered and loved by the Dalit community for her contributions of powerful literary and activist work. She is one of the earliest women writers from the untouchable communities whose distinctive reflexive style of feminist writing setting her apart from other Dalit writers and upper caste women writers who gaze was limited and reflexivity incarcerated in caste and masculinity.  

Kamble is critically acclaimed and known for her autobiographical work Jina Amucha, written in Marathi. Feminist scholar Maxine Berntsen was instrumental in encouraging Baby Tai Kamble to publish her writings which Kamble had kept as a secret from her family. Berntsen discovered Kamble interest and her writings in Phaltan where Berntsen was conducting her research. She encouraged and persuaded Baby Tai to publish her writings which soon became one of the best autobiographical accounts on caste, poverty, violence, and triple discrimination faced by Dalit women. This auto-narrative chronicles Baby Tai's life story in precolonial to postcolonial India. It is deeply embedded with two important critical moments in the Indian history: freedom from the British rule and anti-caste movement led by Dr. B.R. Ambedkar. Thus, Baby Tai's auto-biography is just not personal account of a woman's life history but it is a deeply political and a critical record of the making of the nation from the vantage point of a very precarious social location. Jina Amucha public contribution is that it is a nation's biography chronicled from the untouchable woman's  point of view. It is also therefore a critical account of the nation and its margins:  lives of untouchables in a caste Hindu society.  

One of the major portions of the book articulates caste and gender discrimination and multilayered violence suffered by Dalit women at the hands of the savarna (upper caste Hindus) and Dalit men. Kamble writes from an untouchable woman's perspective, not deterring from naming patriarchy in the untouchable community nor sparing the internalized patriarchy by Dalit women. This honesty and reflexivity has been largely missing in upper caste women's writings. Kamble also underscores how the caste Hindu women and men treated untouchables with contempt, disgust, and hate. This work became one of the most powerful and poignant auto-biographical writing in Marathi. The book was translated into English titled The Prisons We Broke by Maya Pandit and published by Orient Blackswan. 

Baby Tai wrote several articles and poems focused on Dalits and also ran a residential school for children from vulnerable communities. She died on 21 April 2012, aged 82, in Phaltan, Maharashtra.

Early life and marriage 
Babytai Kamble was born in 1929 to an economically stable family. Her father worked as a labour contractor and her maternal grandfather and grand-uncles worked as butlers for the British.

She went to a girls school which was dominated and run by Brahmins, where she and other Dalit girls were subject to discrimination and segregation. They were made to sit in a corner, separated from other students. She was married at the age of 13 to Kondiba Kamble, after passing the fourth standard. The bride, groom and their families had a marriage ceremony without a Brahmin priest as officiator.

She and her husband began their own business of selling loose grapes. After they started making profits, they included vegetables in their merchandise. Soon after, this business venture expanded into a profitable initiative of selling food and other grocery provisions. Their customers were predominantly from the Mahar community. Babytai and Kondiba had ten children, three of whom died during childhood.

Activism 
While sitting at the shop counter, Kamble began reading newspapers that were used for packing. It was around this time she began penning her autobiography Jina Amaucha (The Prisons We Broke). She also joined a library and began reading books from there. In her spare time, she would write in notebooks. She chronicled the lives of fellow Dalit women and how they negotiated with patriarchy and caste. Jina Amucha has been translated into various languages.

Kamble was involved in the Dalit movement in Maharashtra. This movement saw mass participation and contribution by women. She was a member of the Mahila Mandal in Phaltan. She started a government approved residential school for children from disadvantaged communities in Nimbure, Maharashtra.

References 

1929 births
2012 deaths
Indian Buddhists
Converts to Buddhism from Hinduism
Dalit women writers
Dalit writers
Dalit activists